The Leadhills and Wanlockhead Railway is a  narrow gauge railway in South Lanarkshire, Scotland.

Overview
The preserved section runs from Leadhills for about  towards Wanlockhead and is the highest adhesion railway in the UK. The rack and pinion Snowdon Mountain Railway is higher. Trains are currently diesel worked with the locomotive propelling the train up hill away from Leadhills.

The original railway closed in the late 1930s shortly after the mines in Wanlockhead had closed.

The railway currently stops at the border of South Lanarkshire and Dumfries and Galloway.

Operation
Trains operate on the push-pull principle as there are no run round loop facilities at the end of the run. Movements within the main station site at Leadhills are controlled from the reconstructed signal box which contains the original lever frame from Arrochar and Tarbet signal box.

Bus replacement
For two weeks during July 2016 the railway operated an extended service, connecting with local bus routes,  as the road between Wanlockhead and Leadhills was closed for repairs.

Awards
The Leadhills & Wanlockhead won the Heritage Railway Association Annual Awards 2016, Small Groups

See also
 British narrow gauge railways

References

Bibliography

External links

The Railway website (Archive)
Video and commentary on the Leadhills & Wanlockhead Railway.

Heritage railways in Scotland
Transport in South Lanarkshire
2 ft gauge railways in Scotland
Leadhills
Railway lines opened in 1986